Raïna Raï, is an Algerian raï band from Sidi Bel Abbès. It formed in 1980 in Paris and continues to this day.
The founding members are Tarik Naïmi Chikhi, Kaddour Bouchentouf, Lotfi Attar  and Hachemi Djellouli.

History 
The group was established in December 1980 in Paris.

Members 
 Kada Guebbache : Vocal & Karkabou
 Hachemi Djellouli : Percussions
 Lotfi Attar : Former guitar player
 Reda Gherici : Vocal & Bass Guitar
 Abderahmane Dendane : Saxophone
 Nadjib Gherici : Guitare

Discography

Albums 

 Raina Rai, 1982, Sadi Disques.
 Hagda, 1983, auto-production (HTK Productions) two titles were used in the original soundtrack of the film Tchao Pantin of Claude Berri featuring Coluche.
 Rana Hna, 1985, Edition Rachid & Fethi.
 Mama, 1988, Edition Rachid & Fethi.
 Zaama, 1992, Musidisc.
 Bye Bye, 2001, Lazer Production.

Lives 

 Live in Algiers, 1985, youth festival in Riad El-Feth with Touré Kunda.
 Live in Paris, 1986 in La Villette, auto-production Sadi Disques.
 Live in Quebec, 1987 with Manu Dibango.
 Live in Marrakech, 1987.
 Tour in United States & au Canada, 1991 in Washington, Boston, Montréal, New York City & San Francisco.
 Live in Frankfurt, 1992, Panafricain festival with Alpha Blondy.
 Live in Algiers, 2000 20th anniversary of Raïna Raï.
 Live in Paris, 2002, registered in Le Divan du Monde.
 Live in Casablanca, 2005.
 Live in Oran, 2008, édition AS.

Gallery

References

External links
 Raïna Raï website
 Raïna Raï songs – maghrebspace.com

Algerian musical groups
1980 establishments in France